Henry Becher (fl. 1561) was an English translator and vicar of Mayfield, in the jurisdiction of South Malling. He translated into the English tongue and adorned with a long preface against the late Pelagians – i.e. Henry Hart and others in Kent, Essex, London, and other places – the two books of St. Ambrose de Vocatione Gentium. In the preface are many things concerning this heresy which was active in many parts of England in the times of Henry VIII and Queen Mary. The full title of his translation is as follows: , London, 1561, octavo.

References

DNB references
These references are found in the DNB article referred to above.

External links
 

Year of birth missing
Year of death missing
16th-century English people
16th-century translators
Latin–English translators
People from Mayfield, East Sussex